Chadron Moore, better known by his stage name Nitti Beatz, is an American Grammy- Nominated record producer who has been active since 2000 and signed to So So Def Recordings from 2005 to 2008.

He was credited as a producer on 8Ball's second album Almost Famous. He did production work on many projects released through Jermaine Dupri's So So Def label. He founded the production company Playmaker Music in 2002, in which they sign artists, producers, & songwriters to deals under this imprint. Nitti plays many different instruments. Playmaker Music inked a non-exclusive distribution deal with 300 Entertainment in 2016. Playmaker is based in Atlanta, Ga.

Discography

Albums 
Most Wanted Presents Live or Die in G.I w/h Don Vito (1998)
Don't Take It Personal (2002)
Ghettoville U.S.A. (2010)
Throw a Beat On (2011)
808 King (2013)
Old Dope (2015)

Featured singles 
1998: "In Decatur (Remix) Ghetto Mafia
2001: "Stop Playin' Games" 8ball of 8ball & MJG
2005: "Dem Boyz" Boyz n da Hood featuring Nitti)
2005: "Go Head" (Gucci Mane featuring Mac Bree-Z)
2006: "It's Goin' Down" (Yung Joc featuring Nitti)
2010: "Bring It Back" (8Ball & MJG featuring Nitti & Young Dro)
2010: "Get Big" (Dorrough featuring Nitti)
2013: "Sucka"  (Rocko featuring Too Short) 
2015: "Flex (Ooh, Ooh, Ooh)" (Rich Homie Quan) 
2015: "Buss It" (Bankroll Fresh) 
2015: "In Ya Life (Webbie)

Personal life 
In 2008, Nitti welcomed a son born in Atlanta, Ga. He once stated, "I always wanted to be a father to a son since I was raised by my mother without a father". As of today, Nitti is single & not married.

References 

African-American rappers
African-American record producers
American music industry executives
American hip hop record producers
Living people
Songwriters from Georgia (U.S. state)
Southern hip hop musicians
People from Decatur, Georgia
Production discographies
Record producers from Georgia (U.S. state)
21st-century American rappers
1975 births
African-American songwriters
21st-century African-American musicians
20th-century African-American people